The Tchefuncte River Range Lights are a range that was first established in 1838 to aid vessels entering the Tchefuncte River from the north side of Lake Pontchartrain, Louisiana. The lighting apparatus was supplied by Winslow Lewis and consisted of nine lamps with several fourteen-inch reflectors. The original rear tower suffered during the Civil War and was replaced with the current tower in 1868. The new tower, ten feet taller than the first, was built on the same foundation, using some of the same brick. It was given a lantern which had been removed from Cat Island Light in Mississippi.

The rear tower has a black vertical stripe to serve as the range line in daytime. It sits on a spit of land, but is accessible only by boat. The front tower is marked with a standard USCG KRW daymark, with a red stripe between two white stripes. It is a skeleton tower and sits in open water.

The rear tower was added to the National Register of Historic Places in 1986. The Maritime Museum Louisiana is making efforts to restore and stabilize the light.

References
The Light List  spells the river name "Tchefuncta", but that's in conflict with the U.S. Board on Geographical Names

External links 
 

Lighthouses completed in 1838
Lighthouses completed in 1868
Buildings and structures in St. Tammany Parish, Louisiana
Lighthouses on the National Register of Historic Places in Louisiana
Transportation in St. Tammany Parish, Louisiana
National Register of Historic Places in St. Tammany Parish, Louisiana